Meeks Bay (formerly, Meigs Bay, Micks Bay, and Murphys) is an unincorporated community in El Dorado County, California. It lies on Lake Tahoe at the mouth of Meeks Creek, at an elevation of 6240 feet (1902 m). The place is named for John Meeks, who owned the land. The Meeks brothers baled 25 tons of wild hay in the meadows at the mouth of Meeks Creek in 1862.

A post office operated at Meeks Bay from 1929 to 1972.

Ecology

References

Unincorporated communities in California
Unincorporated communities in El Dorado County, California
1929 establishments in California